The 1992 Albany Firebirds season was the third season for the Firebirds. They finished 5–5 and lost in the 1st round of the AFL playoffs to the Dallas Texans.

Regular season

Schedule

Standings

z – clinched homefield advantage

y – clinched division title

x – clinched playoff spot

Playoffs

Roster

Awards

External links
1992 Albany Firebirds on ArenaFan.com

Albany Firebirds
Albany Firebirds
Indiana Firebirds seasons